Rami Rantanen (born 25 November 1968) is a retired Finnish football midfielder, currently serving as head coach of PK-35 in the Kansallinen Liiga. He played for Swedish Trelleborgs FF during the mid 1990's.

References 

1968 births
Living people
Finnish footballers
Helsingin Jalkapalloklubi players
Reipas Lahti players
FC Kuusysi players
Trelleborgs FF players
PK-35 Vantaa (men) players
FC Jokerit players
Atlantis FC players
AC Allianssi players
Finland under-21 international footballers
Finland international footballers
Association football midfielders
Finnish expatriate footballers
Expatriate footballers in Sweden
Finnish expatriate sportspeople in Sweden
Veikkausliiga players
Allsvenskan players
Footballers from Helsinki